Foxon is a surname. Notable people with the surname include: 

David Foxon (1923–2001), English bibliographer
Tom Foxon, British physicist